Vagococcus teuberi is a bacterium from the genus of Vagococcus which has been isolated from fermented soured milk from Bamako.

References 

Lactobacillales
Bacteria described in 2018